Richardson Pratt Jr (March 25, 1923 - May 1, 2001) was an American businessman and educational administrator, president of the Pratt Institute in Brooklyn from 1972 to 1990, and chairman of Charles Pratt & Company.

Early life
Richardson Pratt Jr was born on March 25, 1923, and grew up in Brooklyn and Glen Cove, New York. He was the son of Richardson Pratt (1894-1959) and his wife, Laura Cecilia Parsons, and the grandson of Charles Millard Pratt. He was a great-grandson of the founder of the Pratt Institute, Charles Pratt.

He was educated at the Choate School and earned a bachelor's degree from Williams College in 1946, and a master's degree from the Harvard Business School in 1948.

Career
He was president of the Pratt Institute in Brooklyn from 1972 to 1990, and chairman of Charles Pratt & Company.

Personal life
In 1944, Pratt married Mary Esterbrook Offutt, the daughter of Mr and Mrs Caspar Yost Offutt, a former diplomat, in Omaha, Nebraska. Her uncle was the aviator Jarvis Offutt. She was educated at Shipley School and Vassar College.

They had three children, Laura P. Gregg of Bryn Mawr, Pennsylvania, Thomas R. Pratt of Coconut Grove, Florida, and David O. Pratt of Chestnut Hill, Pennsylvania.

Pratt died from pancreatic cancer on May 1, 2001 at his home in Cold Spring Harbor, New York, aged 78.

References

1923 births
2001 deaths
20th-century American businesspeople
Charles Pratt family
People from Clinton Hill, Brooklyn
People from Glen Cove, New York
Williams College alumni
Harvard Business School alumni
Choate Rosemary Hall alumni
People from Cold Spring Harbor, New York
Deaths from cancer in New York (state)
Presidents of Pratt Institute
Deaths from pancreatic cancer